Justice Pickering may refer to:

John Pickering (judge) (1737–1805), chief justice of the New Hampshire Supreme Court
Kristina Pickering (born 1952), chief justice of the Supreme Court of Nevada (2013, 2020–present)

See also
Judge Pickering (disambiguation)